Gastric mucosal restitution is an alteration in the morphology/organization of cells in response to gastric damage.  It contributes to the reformation of the gastric mucosal barrier.

References

Digestive system
Human physiology